Valand Academy is a school for film, photography, literary composition, and fine art at the University of Gothenburg in Gothenburg, Sweden.

It was formed in 2012 through the merger of three formerly independent schools/departments at the University of Gothenburg. Valand Academy can trace its roots back to the year 1865, and is older than the University of Gothenburg (founded 1891).

History 

The Valand School of Fine Art was founded as the Gothenburg Drawing School in 1865 and has been part of the University of Gothenburg since 1977. The school is situated in central Gothenburg, currently across Vasagatan from the original building. Valand was the name of the construction company formed in order to build the original building which is now occupied by a nightclub of the same name, as well as a fraternal order.

In 2012, the Valand School of Fine Art merged with three other formerly independent institutions at the University of Gothenburg: the School of Film Directing, the School of Photography and the Department of Literary Composition.

Students 
Currently approximately 200 students study on Bachelor and Master programmes in photography, fine art, film and literary composition at the Valand Academy of Arts. There are also the equivalent of 100 full-time places taken by students who study part-time on "free-standing courses." Study places at the Academy are highly sought, and typically there are 400+ applicants for 12 places on the Bachelor programme in fine art each year and 200+ applicants for the 6 places in film.

The Academy also provides doctoral studies (PhD) for practitioners and typically has 10 doctoral researchers working at any one time on individual projects in all four subject areas.

Each spring the graduating master students exhibit together in Göteborgs Konsthall. The Academy currently has two in-house galleries, Monitor and Rotor 2, and is developing a third external exhibition venue.

Notable alumni 
 Ivar Arosenius
 Ernst Billgren
 Torsten Billman
 Axel Boman
 Gabo Camnitzer
 Ann Edholm
 Einar Hákonarson
 Snövit Hedstierna
 Pål Hollender
 Dan Lissvik
 Ruben Östlund
 Gustaf Tenggren
 Jim Thorell
 Úlfur Karlsson
 Helene Billgren

Notable professors 
Carl Larsson
Bruno Liljefors
Torsten Billman
Peter Dahl
Maria Lindberg
Tor Bjurström

References

External links
Valand Academy Official site

University of Gothenburg
Art schools in Sweden
Culture in Gothenburg
University departments in Sweden
Tourist attractions in Gothenburg
Avenyn
1865 establishments in Sweden
Educational institutions established in 1865

sv:Akademin Valand